Hiroki Kobayashi (born December 29, 1992) is a Japanese footballer who currently plays for Kitsap Pumas in the Premier Development League.

Career

College
Kobayashi spent his entire college career at Harvard University.  He made a total of 61 appearances for the Crimson and tallied seven goals and four assists.

Professional
On March 14, 2015, Kobayashi joined PDL club Kitsap Pumas for the 2015.  He made his debut for the club on June 14 in a 1–0 victory over Puget Sound Gunners FC.  On June 25, Kobayashi, along with Nick Hamer and Mike Ramos, was loaned to USL club Seattle Sounders FC 2.  He made his professional debut that same night in a 1–0 victory over Real Monarchs SLC.

References

External links
USSF Development Academy bio
Harvard Crimson bio

1992 births
Living people
Japanese footballers
Japanese expatriate footballers
Harvard Crimson men's soccer players
Kitsap Pumas players
Tacoma Defiance players
Association football forwards
Expatriate soccer players in the United States
USL League Two players
USL Championship players
Japanese expatriate sportspeople in the United States
People from Okazaki, Aichi